Xinbei may refer to:

Xinbei District (新北区), Changzhou, Jiangsu, People's Republic of China (PRC)
New Taipei (新北市), special municipality in northern Taiwan, originally named Taipei County.
Xinbei, Meizhou (新陂镇), town in Xingning, Guangdong, PRC

See also
New North (disambiguation)